Faizievite is a very rare mineral with the formula K2Na(Ca6Na)Ti4Li6Si24O66F2. This triclinic mineral is chemically related to baratovite and katayamalite. Faizievite is a single-locality mineral, coming from the moraine of the Darai-Pioz glacier, Tien Shan Mountains, Tajikistan. Alkaline rocks of this site are famous for containing numerous rare minerals, often enriched in boron, caesium, lithium, titanium, rare earth elements, barium, and others.

Occurrence and association
Faizievite was detected in quartz boulders, together with aegirine, baratovite, fluorite, leucosphenite, pectolite, and polylithionite.

Notes on chemistry and structure
Strontium and trace amounts of rubidium, barium and niobium are present in the structure of faizievite. One of the sodium sites is partially vacant, and fluorine may be substituted by oxygen.

Relation to other minerals
Faizievite is related to beryl and osumilite groups of minerals.

References

Silicate minerals
Cyclosilicates
Lithium minerals
Titanium minerals
Potassium minerals
Sodium minerals
Calcium minerals
Fluorine minerals
Triclinic minerals
Minerals in space group 2